In geometry, a group of isometries of hyperbolic space  is called geometrically finite if it has a well-behaved fundamental domain.  A hyperbolic manifold is called geometrically finite if it can be described in terms of geometrically finite groups.

Geometrically finite polyhedra

A convex polyhedron C in hyperbolic space is called geometrically finite if its closure  in the conformal compactification of hyperbolic space has the following property:

For example, every polyhedron with a finite number of faces is geometrically finite.  In hyperbolic space of dimension at most 2, every geometrically finite polyhedron has a finite number of sides, but there are geometrically finite polyhedra in dimensions 3 and above with infinitely many sides. For example, in Euclidean space Rn of dimension n≥2 there is  a polyhedron P with an infinite number of sides. The upper half plane model of n+1 dimensional hyperbolic space in Rn+1 projects to Rn, and the inverse image of P under this projection is a geometrically finite polyhedron with an infinite number of sides.

A geometrically finite polyhedron has only a finite number of cusps, and all but finitely many sides meet one of the cusps.

Geometrically finite groups

A discrete group G of isometries of hyperbolic space is called geometrically finite if it has a fundamental domain C that is convex, geometrically finite, and exact (every face is the intersection of C and gC for some g ∈ G) .

In hyperbolic spaces of dimension at most 3, every exact, convex, fundamental polyhedron for a geometrically finite group has only a finite number of sides, but in dimensions 4 and above there are examples with an infinite number of sides .

In hyperbolic spaces of dimension at most 2, finitely generated discrete groups are geometrically finite, but  showed that there are examples of finitely generated discrete groups in dimension 3 that are not geometrically finite.

Geometrically finite manifolds

A hyperbolic manifold is called geometrically finite if it has a finite number of components, each of which is the quotient of hyperbolic space by a geometrically finite discrete group of isometries .

See also 

 Density theorem for Kleinian groups

References

Hyperbolic geometry
Kleinian groups